The Balrog Awards were a set of awards given annually from 1979 to 1985 for the best works and achievements of speculative fiction in the previous year. The awards were named after the balrog, a fictional creature from J. R. R. Tolkien's Middle-earth legendarium. The awards were originally announced by editor Jonathan Bacon in Issue #15 of Fantasy Crossroads and presented at the Fool-Con II convention on April Fool's Day, 1979 at Johnson County Community College, Kansas. The awards were never taken seriously and are often referred to, tongue-in-cheek, as the "coveted Balrog Awards".

Awards (By Year)

1979
 Best Novel: Blind Voices, Tom Reamy
 Best Short Fiction: "Death from Exposure", Pat Cadigan
 Best Collection/Anthology: Born to Exile, Phyllis Eisenstein
 Best Poet: Ray Bradbury
 Best Artist: Tim Kirk
 Best Amateur Publication: Shayol
 Best Professional Publication: Age of Dreams, Alicia Austin
 Best Amateur Achievement: Paul C. Allen (for Fantasy Newsletter and "Of Swords & Sorcery")
 Best Professional Achievement: J. R. R. Tolkien and Donald M. Grant (tie)
 Judges' Choice: Jonathan Bacon (for Fantasy Crossroads)
 Judges' Choice: Andre Norton (for lifetime achievement)

1980
 Best Novel: Dragondrums, Anne McCaffrey
 Best Short Fiction: "The Last Defender of Camelot", Roger Zelazny
 Best Collection/Anthology: Night Shift, Stephen King
 Best Poet: H. Warner Munn
 Best Artist: Michael Whelan
 Best Amateur Publication: Fantasy Newsletter
 Best Professional Publication: Omni
 Best Amateur Achievement: Paul Allen (for Fantasy Newsletter and "Of Swords and Sorcery")
 Best Professional Achievement: Anne McCaffrey
 SF Film Hall of Fame: 2001: A Space Odyssey and Star Wars (tie)
 Fantasy Film Hall of Fame: Fantasia
 Special Award: Ian Ballantine & Betty Ballantine

1981
 Best Novel: The Wounded Land, Stephen R. Donaldson
 Best Short Fiction: "The Web of the Magi", Richard Cowper
 Best Collection/Anthology: Unfinished Tales, J. R. R. Tolkien, edited by Christopher Tolkien
 Best Poet: H. Warner Munn
 Best Artist: Frank Frazetta
 Best Amateur Publication: Fantasy Newsletter
 Best Professional Publication: F&SF
 Best Amateur Achievement: Paul C. Allen & Susan Allen (for Fantasy Newsletter)
 Best Professional Achievement: George Lucas (for contributions, including the Star Wars saga)
 SF Film Hall of Fame: The Empire Strikes Back
 Fantasy Film Hall of Fame: The Wizard of Oz
 Special Award: Jorge Luis Borges
 Special Award: Fritz Leiber

1982
 Best Novel: Camber the Heretic, Katherine Kurtz
 Best Short Fiction: "A Thief in Korianth", C. J. Cherryh
 Best Collection/Anthology: Shadows of Sanctuary, Robert Lynn Asprin, ed.
 Best Poet: Frederick Mayer
 Best Artist: Real Musgrave
 Best Amateur Publication: Eldritch Tales
 Best Professional Publication: Omni
 Best Amateur Achievement: Robert A. Collins (for saving Fantasy Newsletter)
 Best Professional Achievement: George Lucas and Steven Spielberg (tie)
 SF Film Hall of Fame: Forbidden Planet
 Fantasy Film Hall of Fame: King Kong
 Judges' Choice: Leo & Diane Dillon

1983
 Best Novel: The One Tree, Stephen R. Donaldson
 Best Short Fiction: "All of Us Are Dying", George Clayton Johnson
 Best Collection/Anthology: Storm Season, Robert Lynn Asprin, ed.
 Best Poet: Frederick J. Mayer
 Best Artist: Tim Hildebrandt
 Best Amateur Publication: Shayol
 Best Professional Publication: F&SF
 Best Amateur Achievement: Allan Bechtold (for SF workshops)
 Best Professional Achievement: Ben Bova (for writing and editing Omni and Analog)
 SF Film Hall of Fame: The Day the Earth Stood Still
 Fantasy Film Hall of Fame: Dark Crystal
 Special Award: Kirby McCauley

1984
 Best Novel: The Armageddon Rag, George R. R. Martin
 Best Short Story: "Wizard Goes A-Courtin'", John Morressy
 Best Collection/Anthology: Unicorn Variations, Roger Zelazny
 Best Poet: Frederick J. Mayer
 Best Artist: Real Musgrave
 Best Amateur Publication: Fantasy Newsletter
 Best Professional Publication: F&SF
 Best Amateur Achievement: Stan Gardner (for saving the Balrogs)
 Best Professional Achievement: Pendragon Gallery (for promoting fantasy artwork)
 SF Film Hall of Fame: Blade Runner
 Fantasy Film Hall of Fame: Bambi
 Judges' Choice: Mercer Mayer (for educating children in fantasy art)

1985
 Best Novel: The Practice Effect, David Brin
 Best Short Story: "A Troll and Two Roses", Patricia A. McKillip
 Best Collection/Anthology: Daughter of Regals and Other Tales, Stephen R. Donaldson
 Best Poet: Ardath Mayhar
 Best Artist: Richard Pini & Wendy Pini
 Best Amateur Publication: Eldritch Tales
 Best Professional Publication: Masques, J. N. Williamson, ed.
 Best Amateur Achievement: David B. Silva (for The Horror Show)
 Best Professional Achievement: Hap Henriksen (for the National SF/Fantasy Hall of Fame)
 SF Film Hall of Fame: Starman
 SF Film Hall of Fame: E.T. The Extraterrestrial
 Fantasy Film Hall of Fame: Raiders of the Lost Ark
 Special Award: Lester del Rey

See also
 Bram Stoker Award
 Hugo Award
 Nebula Award
 World Fantasy Award
 List of science fiction awards

References

American literary awards
B
Science fiction awards
Fantasy awards
Things named after Tolkien works